The 1976 Six Hours of Mugello was the opening round of the 1976 World Championship for Makes. It took place at the Mugello Circuit, Italy on 21 March 1976. It was the first race with the participation of the new "Group 5" cars, also known as "Silhouettes".

Official results
Class winners in bold. Cars failing to complete 75% of the winner's distance marked as Not Classified (NC).

1976 in World Championship for Makes
1976 in Italian motorsport